The NS 7600 was a series of tank engines of the Dutch Railways (NS) and its predecessor Hollandsche IJzeren Spoorweg-Maatschappij (HSM) and Haarlem-Zandvoort Spoorweg Maatschappij (HZSM).

For operations of the railway line between Haarlem and Zandvoort, which opened in 1881, the HZSM ordered three locomotives from Borsig, with a fourth locomotive following shortly after that, the locomotives delivered in 1881 and 1882. In addition to the numbers 1–4, the locomotives carried the names Haarlem, Overveen, Zandvoort and Rudolph Sulzbach. After the operation of this railway was transferred to the HSM on June 1 1889, the locomotives remained the property of the HZSM. However, the locomotives were provided with the HSM numbers 296-299 and the names were removed. 

In 1903, the locomotives were sold to the Ahaus-Enscheder Eisenbahn Gesellschaft, but remained in service with the HSM. Between 1904 and 1906 the HSM renumbered the locomotives in 1001–1004. No. 1004 was seriously damaged in an accident in 1917, after which the locomotive was scrapped. Nos. 1001-1003 were handed over to the HSM at the end of 1918. When the fleets of the HSM and the SS was merged in 1921, the three remaining locomotives of this series were given the NS numbers 7601–7603. No. 7602 was withdrawn in 1926, followed in 1927 by Nos. 7601 and 7603. No locomotives have survived into preservation.

Sources and references 

 J. van der Meer: De Hollandsche IJzeren Spoorweg-Maatschappij. Uitg. Uquilair, 2009, .
 J.J. Karskens: De Locomotieven van de Hollandsche IJzeren Spoorweg Maatschappij. Uitg. J.H. Gottmer, Haarlem - Antwerpen, 1947.
 Het Utrechts Archief.

Rolling stock of the Netherlands
Borsig locomotives
Steam locomotives of the Netherlands
0-6-0 locomotives
0-6-0T locomotives
Hollandsche IJzeren Spoorweg-Maatschappij
Haarlem-Zandvoort Spoorweg Maatschappij